The following is a list of characters from the wuxia novel Baifa Monü Zhuan by Liang Yusheng. Some of these characters are based on historical figures, such as Wei Zhongxian, Xiong Tingbi and the Taichang Emperor. Some characters also appear in the sequels Saiwai Qixia Zhuan and Qijian Xia Tianshan.

Main characters 
 Lian Nichang, also called Lian Nishang and nicknamed "Jade Rakshasa", is the protagonist. Abandoned by her parents at birth, she was raised by wolves and later adopted and trained in martial arts by Ling Muhua. She uses her legendary prowess in swordsmanship and qinggong to deliver justice as a vigilante. Although she is beautiful in appearance, she is deadly as her sword movements are extremely aggressive. She also metes out draconian punishments and torturous deaths to her enemies, projecting an image of herself as a menacing demoness in the jianghu. She becomes known as the "White Haired Demoness" after her hair turns white.
 Zhuo Yihang is Zhuo Jixian's son. Born and raised in a family of scholars, he grew up to be a cultured and refined gentleman. He learns swordsmanship from Taoist Ziyang and eventually succeeds his master as the leader of the Wudang School.
 Yue Mingke is a military attaché serving under the general Xiong Tingbi. A formidable swordsman, he was trained in martial arts by Huo Tiandu. He joins Lian Nichang and Zhuo Yihang in opposing Wei Zhongxian, and becomes a fugitive after Xiong Tingbi was wrongly put to death. After witnessing the tragic death of his lover Tie Shanhu, he feels disillusioned with the power struggles in society and becomes a Buddhist monk, renaming himself "Reverend Huiming". He travels to Mount Heaven and settles there, spending his time meditating and practising martial arts.

Wudang School 

 The Five Elders of Wudang are the most senior members in the Wudang School.
 Taoist Ziyang is the Wudang School's leader and Zhuo Yihang's master. He is highly respected by his contemporaries not only for his prowess in martial arts, but also for his humility.
 Taoist Huangye
 Taoist Baishi is an egoistic and arrogant individual who deems Lian Nichang inferior and unworthy of Zhuo Yihang's love. He intends to let his elder daughter marry Zhuo Yihang, and often seeks to create opportunities for them to start a romance, but his daughter marries Li Shenshi eventually, much to his dismay. He is captured by the lamas of the Heaven Dragon School and brought to Fengsha Castle. Lian Nichang saves him but he is reluctant to thank her and simply agrees not to interfere in her relationship with Zhuo Yihang anymore.
 Taoist Hongyun
 Taoist Qingsuo
 He Qixia is Taoist Baishi's younger sister who became a nun on Mount Song under the name Abbess Cihui after her husband Li Tianyang divorced her to pursue his career. She hates Li Tianyang and refuses to leave with him when he attempts to persuade her to return to him. Eventually, with help from their son, she reconciles with her husband.
 Taoist Baishi's daughters were raised by their aunt He Qixia, who taught them martial arts.
 He E'hua is the older of the two. She is in love with her cousin Li Shenshi. Her father wants her to marry Zhuo Yihang, who comes from a more prestigious background, but he eventually agrees to let her marry Li Shenshi.
 He Lühua is the younger of the two. She joins Zhuo Yihang in his quest to rescue her father from Fengsha Castle.
 Geng Shaonan specialises in using the slingshot. He views himself highly because of his affiliation with a famous orthodox school and behaves rudely and arrogantly. He is defeated by Lian Nichang in a duel and has two fingers sliced off by her as punishment for his snobbishness. He instigates Zhuo Yihang to attack Lian Nichang when she was duelling with the four elders. Zhuo Yihang, in a confused state, takes the slingshot from Geng Shaonan, and fires at Lian Nichang, causing her to mistakenly believe that he has betrayed her.
 Yu Xincheng is the oldest among the second-generation Wudang members.
 Li Feng is the most senior of the Wudang members in Beijing.

Tie Feilong and associates 
 Tie Feilong is the master of the Tie Family Manor. Although he is looked down on by the orthodox schools because of his ugly appearance and eccentric personality, he is a highly experienced and formidable martial artist who specialises in palm styles. He accepts Lian Nichang as his goddaughter after resolving a misunderstanding with her, and accompanies her on most of her adventures.
 Mu Jiuniang is Tie Feilong's second wife and Tie Shanhu's stepmother. She obtains Ling Muhua's sword manual by chance from the dying Taoist Zhenqian and keeps it for herself. She shows it to Tie Shanhu and they practise the skills in the manual secretly behind Tie Feilong's back. After her husband finds out that she had stolen the manual, he expels her from the family. She meets Gongsun Lei later, marries him and bears him a child. After she is mortally wounded by Gongsun Lei's enemies, she entrusts her child to Tie Feilong, begging him to adopt her child as his grandson.
 Tie Shanhu is Tie Feilong's daughter. She falls in love with Yue Mingke, but he unintentionally hurts her feelings when he is reluctant to marry her. Later, she is taken hostage by Jin Duyi and Ying Xiuyang, who attempt to force Yue Mingke to surrender to them. She breaks free from Jin Duyi's clutches by attacking him, but also ends up being mortally wounded in the process. She dies in peace after Yue Mingke finally admits his love for her.
 Ke Pingting is the illegitimate daughter of Wei Zhongxian and Madam Ke, and an apprentice of Gongsun Daniang. She admires Lian Nichang and desires to be a vigilante too. After overhearing a secret conversation between her parents, she learns that Wei Zhongxian is actually her father and feels so disappointed with her parents' treacherous ways that she decides to leave them for good. She joins the protagonists and becomes Tie Feilong's second goddaughter.

Wang family and associates 
 Wang Jiayin is the leader of the bandit community in northern Shanxi. He is killed in action during a battle against imperial forces.
 Wang Zhaoxi is Wang Jiayin's son and a close friend of Zhuo Yihang.
 Meng Can is Wang Jiayin's sworn brother who serves as a martial arts instructor in the crown prince's residence. Implicated in the Case of the Palace Assault, he was arrested and tortured during interrogation. Although his name is eventually cleared and he is released, he dies shortly due to the injuries from torture.
 Meng Qiuxia is Meng Can's daughter who marries Wang Zhaoxi.
 Bai Min is one of Meng Can's apprentices. He joins Li Zicheng's rebel army later.
 Liu Ximing is a martial arts instructor and an ally of Lian Nichang and Zhuo Yihang.
 Wang Jiayin's followers:
 Wang Zuogua
 Flying Mountain Tiger
 Great Red Wolf

Imperial family and nobles 
 The Wanli Emperor is the ruler of the Ming Empire.
 Zhu Changluo is the Wanli Emperor's son and crown prince. He uncovers the truth behind the Case of the Palace Assault and helps to clear the names of innocent people who were implicated in the case. Later, he succeeds his father as the Taichang Emperor but suffers from poor health and eventually dies from poisoning after consuming the mysterious Red Pills.
 Zhu Changxun is another son of the Wanli Emperor who plots with his mother and uncle to seize the position of crown prince from Zhu Changluo by orchestrating the Case of the Palace Assault. Their plan fails when Wei Zhongxian betrays them. He is demoted to the status of a commoner and placed under house arrest.
 Noble Consort Zheng is the Wanli Emperor's concubine and Zhu Changxun's mother. She is placed under house arrest with her son after their plot to seize the succession fails.
 Imperial Uncle Zheng is Honoured Consort Zheng's brother and Zhu Changxun's maternal uncle. He is executed for plotting to help his nephew seize the succession.
 Consort Li is the Taichang Emperor's favourite concubine.
 The Tianqi Emperor is the young, naïve and inexperienced son and successor of the Taichang Emperor. He has a crush on Madame Ke, who exploits his weakness to manipulate him and collaborate with Wei Zhongxian to make the emperor become a puppet ruler under their control. Like his father, the Tianqi Emperor also suffers from poor health and eventually dies of illness.
 The Chongzhen Emperor is a son of the Taichang Emperor who succeeds his nephew, the Tianqi Emperor. He is wiser and more ambitious than his predecessors. Before he became emperor, he was already rallying a group of loyalists to support him and help him save the Ming Empire from collapse. After coming to the throne, he gets rid of Wei Zhongxian and his associates.

Wei Zhongxian and associates 
 Wei Zhongxian is an influential court eunuch who comes to power during the Tianqi Emperor's reign when he manipulates the emperor into becoming a puppet ruler under his control. With backing from his supporters, he persecutes his political opponents and those loyal to the emperor. He is put to death after the Chongzhen Emperor comes to the throne.
 Madam Ke was Wei Zhongxian's secret lover before he became a eunuch. She was the Tianqi Emperor's wet nurse and she knew he had a crush on her, so she collaborates with Wei Zhongxian to manipulate the young emperor and make him a puppet ruler under their control. After the Chongzhen Emperor comes to the throne, he banishes her from the palace.

Jin Duyi and associates 
 Jin Duyi is Gongsun Daniang's husband and one of Wei Zhongxian's allies. He specialises in the "Yin Wind Venomous Gravel Palm", which allows him to discreetly infect a victim with a slow-acting venom that will kill the victim within seven days. He is slain by Yue Mingke after killing Tie Shanhu.
 Gongsun Daniang, nicknamed "Honghua Guimu", is Jin Duyi's wife. Seduced by Jin Duyi, she had betrayed her father and married Jin Duyi and had once helped Jin Duyi defeat a group of 13 rival martial artists. Upon seeing that he refuses to mend his ways, she leaves him and leads a reclusive life for three decades until he comes to seek her help. Tie Feilong and Lian Nichang narrowly defeat her in a martial arts contest through careful planning. She commits suicide in shame when Yue Mingke, after avenging Tie Shanhu, publicly reveals her husband's evil deeds.
 Gongsun Lei is Jin Duyi and Gongsun Daniang's son who follows in his evil father's footsteps. At one point, he rapes a woman and causes her to hang herself in shame. He is ultimately forced to commit suicide by Huo Yuanzhong.
 Gongsun Yiyang was Gongsun Daniang's father who was a reclusive master of martial arts and toxicology. He died in anger after discovering that his daughter and Jin Duyi had betrayed him and stolen his martial arts manual.
 Jin Qianyan is an imperial guard and Jin Duyi's nephew who has learnt the "Yin Wind Venomous Gravel Palm" from his uncle, but is less skilful in using it. He murders Taoist Zhenqian and steals the sword manual left behind by Ling Muhua.
 Hao Jianchang is Jin Duyi's apprentice who makes a surprise attack on Taoist Baishi and injures him severely.

Jianghu figures 
 Yun Yanping is an imperial guard who specialises in using a Tibetan style of "soft" attack.
 Changqin is a Tibetan lama who uses a pair of cymbals as weapons. Originally hired by Wei Zhongxian to serve as the Tianqi Emperor's bodyguard, he joins Mengsasi's tribe after Wei Zhongxian's downfall.
 Rong Yidong helps Ying Xiuyang and the Wang brothers rob Tangnu. Lian Nichang shows up, saves Tangnu and kills Rong Yidong.
 Hu Mai, nicknamed "Ground Deity", is a confidence trickster. He and his partner-in-crime, Meng Fei, rely on boasting and lying to trick others into showing sympathy towards them. They produce the Red Pills and present them to the Taichang Emperor through Li Kezhuo. The emperor dies from poisoning after consuming the pills.
 Meng Fei, nicknamed "Divine Hand", is Hu Mai's accomplice.

Manchu spies 
 Zheng Hongtai is an agent of the Eastern Depot, one of the Ming Empire's spy agencies. When Zhu Changluo sends him to escort Zhuo Yihang home, Zhuo Yihang discovers that he is actually a double agent working for the Manchus. Zheng Hongtai is ultimately defeated by Lian Nichang and captured by Yue Mingke. Lian Nichang tortures him to force him to reveal the names of his accomplices and kills him after that.
 Ying Xiuyang murdered Luo Jinfeng and escapes after being defeated by Lian Nichang on Mount Hua. He becomes one of Wei Zhongxian's henchmen and gets into conflict with Lian Nichang and Zhuo Yihang on many occasions. Eventually, he is drugged by Ke Pingting, and bound and sent to Lian Nichang. He is killed by Tie Feilong after Lian Nichang forces him to list the names of his accomplices.
 Lian Chenghu is the chief manager of Western Depot, another of the Ming Empire's spy agencies. He joins Mengsasi's tribe after Wei Zhongxian's downfall.

Officials 
 Fang Congzhe is the chancellor.
 Li Kezhuo is the emperor's chamberlain. He presents the Red Pills to the Taichang Emperor, causing the emperor to die from poisoning. Wei Zhongxian and Fang Congzhe help him cover up the case and he gets rewarded for his attempt to "cure" the emperor.
 Cui Chengxiu is one of Wei Zhongxian's followers. Wei Zhongxian sends him to read a false imperial edict about Xiong Tingbi's alleged treason and failure in duties, and arrest Xiong Tingbi after reading it.
 Pan Ruzhen is the Inspector of Zhejiang who suggests building a memorial for Wei Zhongxian.
 Wang Shaohui is the writer of the "Records of Generals", a list of names of Wei Zhongxian's political rivals.
 Xu Xianchun is Wei Zhongxian's godson who oversees the murder of Yang Lian in prison.
 Wei Guangzheng is Wei Zhongxian's nephew.
 Ruan Dazhen
 Gu Qian
 Fu Yue
 Ni Wenhuan
 Yang Weiyuan
 Lu Wanling

Martial artists hired by Zheng Hongtai 
 Zhao Ting is from the Songyang School. He leaves after realising that he was tricked into helping the spies.
 Fan Zhu is killed by Lian Nichang.
 Ling Xiao, nicknamed "Jade Faced Demonic Fox", is killed by Lian Nichang.
 Taoist Qingsong leaves after realising that he was tricked into helping the spies.

Government officials 
 Xiong Tingbi is the military governor of Liaodong. Viewed as a hero by the people, he is tasked with defending the Ming Empire's northern border from the Manchu invaders. He is defeated by Manchu forces when Wang Huazhen refuses to cooperate with him, and is executed as punishment for his defeat. Before his death, he wrote a book, Discussion on Liaodong, explaining his strategies to counter the Manchu invasion.
 Ministers in the Three Departments and Six Ministries:
 Sun Shenxing is the Minister of Rites.
 Zhou Jiamo is the Minister of Personnel.
 Hui Shiyang
 Ministry of War:
 Yang Kun is the Minister of War.
 Li Jingbai succeeds Yang Kun as Minister of War.
 Liu Guojin
 Liu Tingyuan
 Yang Lian is a loyalist who opposes Wei Zhongxian. After he is framed and imprisoned, Lian Nichang breaks into prison to save him but he refuses her help. He is murdered in prison by Wei Zhongxian's men.
 Sun Chengzong
 Officials in the Censorate:
 Yao Zongwen
 Feng Sanyuan
 Wang Anshun
 Zou Yuanbiao
 Zuo Guangdou is Du Mingzhong's uncle. He is murdered in prison by Wei Zhongxian's men, along with Yang Lian and other loyalists.
 Military personnel:
 Wang Zan is Xiong Tingbi's bodyguard and an apprentice of Qiu Taixu.
 Wang Huazhen is appointed by Xiong Tingbi as the Inspector of Guangning. Unwilling to cooperate with Xiong Tingbi, he causes the Ming forces to be defeated by the Manchus. He is demoted after his defeat.
 Yuan Yingtai is sent to replace Xiong Tingbi after the latter is executed. He is incompetent and suffers defeats at the hands of the Manchus.
 He Shixian is Yuan Yingtai's subordinate who is killed in action.
 You Shigong is Yuan Yingtai's subordinate who is killed in action.
 Yuan Chonghuan is a general who succeeds Xiong Tingbi as commander of the Ming forces on the northern border. He receives Xiong Tingbi's book Discussion on Liaodong from Lian Nichang.
 Imperial Envoy Li and Imperial Envoy Zhou are emissaries sent by the emperor to meet Zhuo Yihang. They are infected with a slow-acting poison by Jin Qianyan, who hopes that they will die from poisoning days later in Zhuo's house, so that he can frame Zhuo for murdering the emissaries. However, Zhuo notices that the emissaries are poisoned and saves them.
 Eunuchs:
 Pang Bao is a high-ranking court eunuch who is implicated in the Case of the Palace Assault and executed. They are replaced by Wei Zhongxian.
 Liu Cheng is a high-ranking court eunuch.
 Long Chengye is an Inner Court Colonel.
 Tian Ergeng is the Nine Gates Infantry Commander.
 Ye Xianggao succeeds Fang Congzhe as chancellor.
 Wang Bingbei leads a group of soldiers to arrest Zhuo Yihang when he was accused of murdering the two emissaries.
 Hong Chengchou
 Chen Qiyu
 Wei Dazhong
 Gu Dazhang
 Yuan Huazhong
 Zhou Chaorui

Secret police 

 Li Tianyang is He Qixia's ex-husband who divorced his wife to pursue his career by marrying a general's daughter. After he became a secret police commander, he attempts to persuade his ex-wife to return to him but she refuses. Happy to be reunited with his son, he decides to give up his job and release his son and other captives from prison. He manages to reconcile with his wife with help from their son.
 Shi Hao is a secret police commander who is killed by Zhuo Yihang.
 Hu Guozhu is Li Tianyang's escort who is defeated by He Ehua in a fight.
 Commander Qin escorts the emissaries Li and Zhou to Zhuo Yihang's house.
 Cui Yingyuan is a secret police commander present at the scene of Yang Lian's murder. He secretly memorises Yang Lian's final statement and spreads it, causing Yang to be remembered in history as a loyalist.

Palace guards 
 Cheng Kun is a palace guard commander loyal to the Taichang Emperor who is arrested and imprisoned by Wei Zhongxian after suspecting that the emperor was poisoned to death. Wei Zhongxian agrees to release him after his colleagues promise to persuade him to make a false statement about the emperor's death. When he refuses to make the false statement, his colleagues immobilise him and attempt to kill him, but Yue Mingke shows up and saves him. To express his gratitude, he presents Yue Mingke with a pair of combat gloves that can protect the wearer from sharp weapons and poison.
 Wang Cheng is Cheng Kun's deputy who betrays his superior and pledges loyalty to Wei Zhongxian. He is knocked unconscious by Yue Mingke when he is about to kill Cheng Kun.
 Dong Fang is an old colleague of Cheng Kun who suggests that Cheng Kun fakes his death to deceive Wei Zhongxian. However, before he can carry out the plan, he is immobilised by one of Wei Zhongxian's henchman who has been hiding nearby and listening to his conversation.
 Wang Tingfu is a palace guard tasked with escorting Tangnu. He collaborates with Ying Xiuyang to rob Tangnu, but gets killed by Lian Nichang when she shows up to help Tangnu.
 Wang Tinglu is Wang Tingfu's twin brother who is killed by Tangnu's bodyguard.
 Huang Biao is the manager of Madam Ke's living quarters.
 Bai Guangsi is a martial arts instructor in Zhu Youjian's residence.

Rebels

Li Zicheng and associates 
 Li Zicheng, nicknamed "Young Dashing King", is an aspiring young rebel leader. He meets Lian Nichang after the latter saves Tangnu from Ying Xiuyang and the robbers.
 Gao Yingxiang, nicknamed "Dashing King", is Li Zicheng's uncle.
 Li Yan is Li Jingbai's son who was trained in martial arts by Wang Tong of the Taiji School. He decides to join the rebels after his father dies at the hands of Wei Zhongxian.
 The Red Lady is Li Yan's wife. Like Lian Nichang, she used to lead an all-female bandit clan before she married Li Yan.
 Li Guo is Li Zicheng's nephew.
 Gao Jie is Gao Yingxiang's subordinate.
 Du Wu, nicknamed "Night Cat", is killed along with Zhang Si by the Shen brothers after refusing to submit to Zhang Xianzhong.
 Zhang Si is nicknamed "Sky Shooting Eagle".

Zhang Xianzhong and associates 
 Zhang Xianzhong, nicknamed "Eight Great King", is a rebel leader from Sichuan. Cruel and greedy, he plundered cities and ordered many massacres.
 Shen Dayuan and Shen Yiyuan are two brothers who have zombie-like appearances, but are highly skilled in martial arts. Although they server Zhang Xianzhong, they are not very loyal to their master and eventually defect to Cheng Zhangwu's side. They are killed by Lian Nichang in Fengsha Castle.

Manchus 
 Nurhaci is the Manchu ruler who leads his army to attack the Ming Empire's northern border.
 Chaketu is a warrior sent by Nurhaci to persuade Yuan Chonghuan to defect to the Manchus. He is slain by Lian Nichang.
 Ketu is an emissary sent by Nurhaci to meet the tribal peoples of Xinjiang.

Tribal peoples 
 Mengsasi is the chief of the Kadaer tribe.
 Kazakh tribe:
 Balong is the deputy chief of the tribe who joins forces with Zhuo Yihang to deal with Tiande Shangren.
 Hachuan
 Longhuyatu
 Xin Wu is a hunter living on Mount Heaven.
 Xin Longzi is Xin Wu's young son. He is grateful to Zhuo Yihang for saving him from Tiande Shangren and becomes his apprentice. He and his father agree to help Zhuo Yihang guard the magical flower that can turn white hair black again.
 Luobu tribe:
 Tangma is the chief of the tribe.
 Tangnu is Tangma's son. In an earlier chapter, his father sends him as an emissary to pay tribute to the Ming emperor. Ying Xiuyang plots with the Wang brothers to rob him, but their plan is foiled by Lian Nichang and Tie Shanhu. Tangnu succeeds his father as chief of his tribe later. He is grateful to Lian Nichang for saving him earlier and lets his daughter learn martial arts from Lian.
 Hamaya, nicknamed "Flying Red Sash", is Tangnu's young daughter. When she is held hostage by Tiande Shangren during the tribal chiefs' meeting, she uses a martial arts move, taught to her by Lian Nichang, to attack Tiande and break free from his clutches.

Shaolin School 

 Jingming is the Shaolin abbot who spars with Yue Mingke and tests his neigong prowess.
 Zunsheng is a Shaolin elder who spars with Yue Mingke in a fist-fighting contest and they arrive at a draw.
 Xuantong is one of Zunsheng's apprentices who specialises in using anqi (projectile weapons). He loses to Yue Mingke in a contest.
 Tianyuan is Jingming's apprentice who spars with Yue Mingke but loses to him. Later, he succeeds his master as the abbot.

Emei School 

 Long Xiaoyun is He Qixia's ex-lover who taught Li Shenshi martial arts.
 Li Shenshi is Li Tianyang and He Qixia's son. As a child, he was trained in martial arts by Long Xiaoyun. He is captured by Wei Zhongxian's men during a skirmish, but his father releases him and his companions secretly and leaves with them. He succeeds in persuading his mother to reconcile with his father. After his marriage to He Ehua, he is accepted by Taoist Baishi as an apprentice and studies Wudang swordsmanship for some time before eventually returning to Emei.

Mount Heaven School and associates 

 Huo Tiandu was Yue Mingke's master. He travelled around the jianghu to learn various forms of swordplay and develop new techniques to counter them. After years of study, he became a formidable swordsman and created his own set of sword movements, which later becomes known as the Mount Heaven Swordplay.
 Ling Muhua was Huo Tiandu's wife. She developed a rivalry with her husband to become the best swordsman/swordswoman in the jianghu and left him and settled in a cave on Mount Hua. She created a new set of sword techniques to counter her husband's. Once, she chanced upon the baby Lian Nichang, adopted her and trained her as her apprentice. She died when her inner energy flow was disrupted during a practice session.
 Yang Yuncong is Yang Lian's young son. He is saved by Luo Tiebi when his father is imprisoned and murdered. On Lian Nichang's recommendation, Luo Tiebi brings the boy to Reverend Huiming, who accepts the child as his apprentice.
 Chu Zhaonan is a boy from Hunan who travels to Xinjiang with his family to escape turmoil in his hometown. His parents commit suicide after their livestock is seized by Mengsasi's men. Reverend Huiming chances upon the boy, saves him and takes him in as his second apprentice.

Heaven Dragon School 
 Tianlong Shangren is the leader of the Heaven Dragon School in Tibet who possesses immense inner energy. At Fengsha Castle, he challenges Zhuo Yihang to a contest, in which Zhuo has to knock him down within three moves, while he will remain seated and not retaliate. Zhuo Yihang was unable to defeat him initially, but Lian Nichang appears and throws a projectile at him when Zhuo is about to deliver the third blow, causing him to lose his balance and fall off the chair.
 Tiande Shangren is an elder of the school who serves the Kazakh tribe's chief as an adviser and abuses his authority by extorting from the common people. He attempts to force Xin Longzi to be his apprentice, but Zhuo Yihang appears and drives him away. He is slain by Zhuo Yihang during the tribal chiefs' meeting.
 Leimeng is Tianlong Shangren's apprentice who is killed by Lian Nichang.
 Elder Wutou is an elder of the school who joins Huo Yuanzhong, Taoist Zhuo and Changqin to attack Lian Nichang, but is defeated and slain by Lian.

Zhuo family 
 Zhuo Zhonglian is Zhuo Yihang's grandfather. He was formerly the governor of Yunnan and Guizhou. While on the way home after his retirement, he was captured by Lian Nichang's bandit clan and taken to their stronghold. Lian Nichang called him "in between an honest and a corrupt official", and took away a portion of his fortune (said to be ill-gotten gains) before releasing him. He dies from overwhelming grief after hearing news of the death of his son.
 Zhuo Jixian is Zhuo Zhonglian's son and Zhuo Yihang's father who served in the Ministry of Revenue. He was implicated in the Case of the Palace Assault and was executed on charges of treason. His name is cleared when the truth behind the case is revealed.

Fengsha Castle 
 Cheng Zhangwu is a former bandit chief from Huainan who settled in Xinjiang and became the master of Fengsha Castle. He hires many martial arts experts to help him fight Lian Nichang and Zhuo Yihang in the hope that defeating them will make him famous.
 Cheng Zhangzhu is Cheng Zhangwu's daughter who is defeated by He Lühua in a duel.

Murong Chong and associates 
 Murong Chong is a highly skilled Hui martial artist from Gansu who specialises in fist styles. In his pursuit of fame and glory, he willingly joins the Eastern Depot and becomes its chief martial arts instructor. Despite working for Wei Zhongxian, he still maintains a personal moral code, and decides to leave Wei Zhongxian after discovering that he is conspiring with the Manchus. He engages Tie Feilong in a duel and saves his life when Wei Zhongxian's men show up to interrupt them. He repents from his past misdeeds and roams the jianghu. Later, he shows up to help Zhuo Yihang escape from the Wudang School.
 Dingxu was a martial artist from the Kunlun Mountains who taught Murong Chong the "72 Styles of Divine Fist".
 Jiao Manzi was a lone bandit from the northwest who taught Murong Chong the Eagle Claw and Iron Vest.

Tang clan 
 Tang Jiabi is Tang Qingchuan's son. His father sends him and Du Mingzhong to demand the return of two items that were robbed from them by Zhu Baochun.
 Tang Qingchuan is the patriarch of the Tang clan who specialises in using anqi.
 Du Mingzhong is Tang Jiabi's escort.

Chang'an Security Service 
 Long Dasan is the third master of the Chang'an Security Service and a friend of Liu Ximing. Tie Feilong saved him from some bandits before. He helps Lian Nichang prepare some protective items for the duel with Gongsun Daniang.
 Lin Zhenjiao is Long Dasan's deputy.

Bandits 
 The "Twin Killers of Xichuan" are two brothers with the family name "Peng".
 Zhou Tong is nicknamed "Mountain Flipping Tiger".
 Zhu Baozhuang is nicknamed "Fiery Spiritual Ape".
 The Fang brothers are from the Daba Mountains. They are killed by Lian Nichang.
 The "Three Heroes of the Mai Family" are three brothers who lead a bandit gang on Mount Dingjun. Mai Fengchun is the oldest of the three.
 Tu Jingxiong is the leader of the Dragon Gate Gang.
 Shao Xuanyang is from southern Shanxi. He uses a smoking pipe as his weapon.
 Gui Youzhang, nicknamed "Eagle Claw King", is from eastern Sichuan. He is killed by Lian Nichang.
 Maheizi is a bandit leader from Kaifeng. He hires Jin Qianyan to help him after Tie Shanhu steals some of his loot. He is knocked down by Yue Mingke and rolls down a slope.
 Zhu Baochun
 Heaven Crossing Star
 Nine Sections Fox

Others 
 Taoist Zhenqian is a Taoist from Mount Hua and a close friend of the Five Elders of Wudang and Huo Tiandu. Yue Mingke passes him the sword manual left behind by Ling Muhua and asks him to bring it to his master. He is murdered by Jin Qianyan.
 Huo Yuanzhong is a reputable martial artist from Shanxi. He attempts to kill Gongsun Lei's family together with Taoist Zhuo and Zhichan Shangren, but Tie Feilong and Lian Nichang manage to stop them in time. He joins Changqin, Elder Wutou and Taoist Zhuo to confront the White Haired Demoness on Mount Heaven years later, but they are defeated by her.
 Taoist Zhuo and Zhichan Shangren are the two sole survivors of the group of 13 martial artists who fought against Gongsun Daniang decades ago. They seek vengeance on her but she had already died so they attack Gongsun Lei and his family. They are defeated and driven away by Tie Feilong and Lian Nichang.
 Luo Tiebi is a martial artist who saves the young Yang Yuncong when the boy's father (Yang Lian) is imprisoned by Wei Zhongxian. He brings Yang Yuncong to Reverend Huiming (Yue Mingke) on Lian Nichang's recommendation.
 Luo Jinfeng is a martial artist from Jibei. He discovers that the Manchus are planning to send spies to infiltrate the Ming dynasty and manages to find out the identities of two of the spies. He passes on the secret to his friend Meng Can, but is murdered by Ying Xiuyang.
 Qiu Taixu was nicknamed "Sun and Moon Wheel".
 Lushi was a monk who founded the Kunlu Sword School.
 The "Three Sang Devils" are three villains who used to terrorise the Mount Heaven region. They are defeated and driven away by Lian Nichang.
 Sangqian
 Sanghu
 Sangren

See also 
 List of organisations in wuxia fiction

References 

 

Lists of Liang Yusheng characters
Baifa Monü Zhuan
Fictional Ming dynasty people